Wuqiao County (literally "Wu Bridge") is a county of southeastern Hebei province, China, bordering Shandong province to the southeast. It is the southernmost county-level division of the prefecture-level city of Cangzhou. Over a period of more than 1500 years, Wuqiao is an old county with a vivid and rich history and culture. Wuqiao is situated in the center of the Huabei Plains and has a pleasant climate most of the year round and it is possible to pleasurably visit here at almost any time of the year.

Near the cities Beijing, Tianjin, Shijiazhuang, and Jinan, Wuqiao County has many transportation connections. There are many rail and bus services operating in the town. Wuqiao was the first Chinese city to open up its doors to the world under the "Open Door" policy and over many years development, Wuqiao has become a flourishing city with a favorable investment environment.

Administrative Divisions
Towns:
Sangyuan, Tiecheng, Yuji, Liangji, Wuqiao County, Anling

Townships:
Caojiawa Township, Songmen Township, Yangjiasi Township, Goudianpu Township, Hezhuang Township

Climate

Wuqiao Acrobatic Culture
The history of Wuqiao county records that lamps lighted up the whole county of Wuqiao for three days during festivals, people set off firecrackers and performed acrobatics, and the local feudal officials did not practice curfew in the period.

The tomb murals of the Eastern Wei Dynasty (534–550) in the Southern and Northern Dynasties Period (386–581) unearthed from Xiaomachang Village of Wuqiao County in 1958 depict the performances of handstands, plate spinning, deft horsemanship and so on. However, it was after the Yuan Dynasty (1271–1368) that acrobatics of Wuqiao gained much reputation. Before that, acrobatics in Henan Province was much more influential. After the Yuan Dynasty was established, the capital was moved from Kaifeng of Henan to Beijing, and the acrobatics in Wuqiao of Hebei, which neighbors Beijing, began to prosper and was increasingly influential.

Wuqiao people are now known for their acrobatic ability and are often in acrobatic troupes throughout China and across the world. When Premier Zhou Enlai visited European countries, he found Wuqiao acrobats often when he met with overseas Chinese. He said that Wuqiao is worth the title of 'home of Chinese acrobatics'.

References

 About Wuqiao and China Acrobatic information
 Wuqiao Local Web Portal

 
County-level divisions of Hebei
Cangzhou